Paul Lerpae (April 7, 1900 – October 5, 1989) was a Mexican born-American special effects artist who was nominated during the 20th Academy Awards for the film Unconquered in the category of Best Special Effects. His nomination was shared with George Dutton, Farciot Edouart, Devereux Jennings, Gordon Jennings and W. Wallace Kelley.

He worked on over 120 films during his long career.

References

External links

Special effects people
People from Mexico City
1900 births
1989 deaths
Academy Award for Technical Achievement winners
Mexican emigrants to the United States